Jorge Díaz Moreno (born 1 July 1977) is a retired Colombian footballer who played as a forward. During his career Díaz Moreno played in Ecuador and Azerbaijan, as well as his native Colombia.

Career statistics

Achievements
Colombia
 Junior
 Categoría Primera A runner-up: 2009

References

External links

1977 births
Living people
Colombian footballers
Colombian expatriate footballers
Categoría Primera A players
Azerbaijan Premier League players
Deportivo Cali footballers
Deportes Quindío footballers
L.D.U. Quito footballers
Once Caldas footballers
Deportivo Pereira footballers
Millonarios F.C. players
Atlético Huila footballers
Cúcuta Deportivo footballers
Atlético Junior footballers
Khazar Lankaran FK players
Association football forwards
Expatriate footballers in Azerbaijan
Footballers from Cali